Legionella dumoffii is a Gram-negative bacterium from the genus Legionella with a monopolar flagellum which was isolated from lung tissue of a patient who suffered from fatal pneumonia. L. dumoffii occurs in soil and freshwater environments and can cause  human pneumonia and accidentally induce other diseases such as prosthetic valve endocarditis and septic arthritis.

References

Legionellales
Bacteria described in 1980